Xingyun Lake also known as Jiangchuan Sea, is a plateau lake in Yunnan Province, China. The Xingyun Lake and the Fuxian Lake are separated by a mountain and linked by a river. The lake has a total area of about 34.71 square kilometers. The average depth is 5.3 m, with an elevation of 1722 m. the water storage capacity is about 1.84×108m3.

Notes

Lakes of Yunnan
Geography of Yuxi